Erkki Olavi Salmenhaara (March 12, 1941 – March 19, 2002) was a Finnish composer and musicologist.

Personal life
Salmenhaara was born in Helsinki, Finland, and married Anja Kosonen in 1961. They had two sons, but divorced in 1978. Salmenhaara died in Helsinki on March 19, 2002.

Career
Salmenhaara studied composition with Joonas Kokkonen at the Sibelius Academy until 1963, and then continued his studies with György Ligeti in Vienna. Salmenhaara then studied musicology, aesthetics and theoretical philosophy at the University of Helsinki, and earned his PhD in 1970 with a doctoral thesis about the works of the composer Ligeti. He served as lecturer (1966–1975) and associate professor (1975–2002) of musicology at the University of Helsinki and was also the leading writer on classical music in Finland. In addition, he served as chairman of the Society of Finnish Composers (1974–1976) and of the Association of Finnish Symphony Orchestras (1974–1978).

Works
Prior to studying with Kokkonen, Salmenhaara had already written several tonal pieces, including the 17 Small Pieces for Piano (1957–1960). In the early 1960s, he was associated with the modernist Finnish Musical Youth.

Beginning in the 1970s, Salmenhaara's works began to be characterized by frequent repetition of triadic motives with gradual changes in harmony. Although this led to his being linked to the movement in music known as minimalism, Salmenhaara nonetheless denied this connection. Like the works of the Dutch minimalist composer Simeon ten Holt, Salmenhaara's works from this period utilize a musical language closely related to that of the Romantic period of classical music, giving his music a decidedly European aesthetic. Salmenhaara's compositions include several symphonic works, chamber music pieces, choral works, songs for solo instrument, and vocal arts songs. He also wrote one opera, Portugalin nainen (The Portuguese Woman) which premiered at the Suomen Kansallisooppera in February 1976.

Salmenhaara's published writings include a textbook on music theory, a history of 20th-century music, monographs on Ligeti, Jean Sibelius's Tapiola and the Brahms symphonies, biographies of Jean Sibelius and Leevi Madetoja, and a history of the Society of Finnish Composers. He also contributed to Erik W. Tawaststjerna's comprehensive biography of Sibelius. His most significant literary work was his contribution to a four-volume history of Finnish music (published in 1995–1996), writing about the period from the Romantic era to the Second World War. In addition, from 1963 to 1973, he served as a critic for the leading Finnish newspaper Helsingin Sanomat.

Discography 
(selection)

 Suomi-Finland, La Fille en mini-jupe, Adagietto, Le bateau ivre. Tampere Philharmonic Orchestra, Eri Klas. Ondine ODE 1031–2.
 Chamber works with piano. Jouni Somero, piano – Raymond Cox, violin – Laura Bucht, cello. FC Records FCRCD-9727.
 Complete solo piano music. Jouni Somero, piano. (2CD) FC Records FCRCD-9707
 Symphonies nos. 2, 3 & 4. Finnish Radio Symphony Orchestra, Paavo Berglund, Petri Komulainen, Ulf Söderblom. Finlandia Classics FINCLA 27.
 Symphony no. 5 "Lintukoto". Finnish Radio Symphony Orchestra, Akateeminen laulu, Riikka Hakola (soprano), Jorma Hynninen (baritone), Jorma Panula. UHCD350.

Selected writings 

 Sointuanalyysi, 1968.
 Das musikalische Material und seine Behandlung in den Werken Apparitions, Atmosphères, Aventures und Requiem von György Ligeti (Dissertation), 1970.
 Tapiola: Sinfoninen runo Tapiola Sibeliuksen myöhäistyylin edustajana, 1970.
 Soinnutus: Harmoninen ajattelu tonaalisessa musiikissa, 1970.
 Tutkielmia Brahmsin sinfonioista, 1979.
 Jean Sibelius, 1984.
 Leevi Madetoja, 1987.
 Löytöretkiä musiikkiin: Valittuja kirjoituksia 1960–1990, 1991.
 Suomen musiikin historia 1–3, 1995–1996.

References

Literature
 Henri-Claude Fantapié: Illuminations, il est grand temps in Muualla, täällä: Kirjoituksia elämästä, kulttuurista, musiikista, pp. 110–118. Ateena Kustannus, Jyväskylä. 2001. 
 Henri-Claude Fantapié: Quelques réflexions personnelles, suppositions et supputations, à propos du naïf dans l'art ou pour servir à une interprétation de l'œuvre d'Erkki Salmenhaara. Boréales n°9/10. 1978. pp. 244–258
 Henri-Claude Fantapié: Le sacré, le rituel et le profane dans deux œuvres d'Erkki Salmenhaara Études finno-ougriennes, Tome 41, 2009. ADÉFO L'Harmattan.
 Guy Rickards:  Erkki Salmenhaara: Finnish music from the avant-garde to the euphonious. The Guardian, Thursday 23 May 2002.

External links
 Composer profile of Erkki Salmenhaara at Music Finland.
 Erkki Salmenhaara in 375 humanists 29.7.2015. Faculty of Arts, University of Helsinki.
Anderson, Martin: Erkki Salmenhaara (obituary). The Independent, 6 April 2002.

1941 births
2002 deaths
20th-century classical composers
Finnish classical composers
Finnish opera composers
Male opera composers
Academic staff of the University of Helsinki
Musicians from Helsinki
Tieto-Finlandia Award winners
Finnish music critics
Finnish male classical composers
20th-century male musicians
20th-century Finnish composers